The 1989–90 1. Slovenská národná hokejová liga season was the 21st season of the 1. Slovenská národná hokejová liga, the second level of ice hockey in Czechoslovakia alongside the 1. Česká národní hokejová liga. 12 teams participated in the league, and Slovan ChZJD Bratislava won the championship and were promoted to the Czechoslovak First Ice Hockey League. Plastika Nitra was also promoted.

Regular season

References

External links
 Season  on avlh.sweb.cz (PDF)

Czech
1st. Slovak National Hockey League seasons
2